New Material is the third studio album by Canadian rock band Preoccupations, released on March 23, 2018, by Flemish Eye in Canada and Jagjaguwar in the United States. It was the band's second album released under this name, after changing it from "Viet Cong" in 2015.

Critical reception

New Material received positive reviews. At Metacritic, which assigns a normalized rating out of 100 to reviews from mainstream publications, the album received an average score of 73, based on 20 reviews, indicating "general favorable reviews".

Track listing

Personnel
The following individuals were credited for the production and composition of the album.

 Daniel Christiansen – group member
 Dave Cooley – mastering
 Matthew Flegel – group member, producer
 Miles Johnson – layout
 Rena Kozak – editing
 Justin Meldal-Johnsen – mixing, synthesizer bass
 Scott Munro – engineer, group member, producer
 Marc Rimmer – back cover photo, cover photo
 Mike Schuppan – mixing engineer
 Michael Wallace – additional production, group member

Charts

References

2018 albums
Flemish Eye albums
Jagjaguwar albums
Preoccupations albums
Post-punk albums by Canadian artists